Jeff or Jeffrey Bell may refer to:

Jeffrey Bell, American television script-writer
Jeff Bell (politician) (1943–2018), American Republican politician
Jeff Bell (executive) (born 1962), American businessman
Jeff Bell (cartoonist) (born 1978), New Zealand cartoonist

See also
Geoff Bell (disambiguation)